Nagappan Padayatchi or Swamy Nagappan Padayachee (1891 – 6 July 1909) is a South African Satyagraha martyr from India.

Early life
Nagappan Padayatchi was an Indian born in Mayiladuthurai in Mayiladuthurai district of Tamil Nadu.

Involvement in Satyagraha 
Nagappan involved in Satyagraha with Mahatma Gandhi on 1909. He was sentenced to 10 days hard labor on 21 June 1909 during the first Satyagraha campaign.

Death
Nagappan was about 18 years old when he was sentenced on 21 June 1909 to the three pounds or ten days imprisonment with hard labor. After spending a night at the Fort he was made to walk to the Jukskei Road Prison Camp, 26 km away. He was discharged from the camp on 30 June and died on 6 July of double pneumonia and resultant heart failure. His body was full of bruises and weals. Fellow prisoners reported that he had been physically abused in prison by at least one warden, and that his illness was neglected by the prison authorities and he was still expected to carry out his hard labor sentence, this ultimately led to his death. Despite all the evidence, the official enquiry exonerated the prison officials and rejected the allegations of the appalling conditions in the Camp.

Memorial
In 1914 Mohandas Gandhi unveiled memorial tablet to Padayachee, as for Gandhi, they were inspirations, "like a lighted match to dry fuel".
Struggle stalwart Walter Sisulu unveils a tombstone for Nagappan, 20 April 1997, in Gandhi Hall. The hall is located on the corner of Ferreira and Marshall streets in down town Johannesburg. It was built by the Transvaal Hindu Seva Samaj in 1939, and was used as a meeting place by the ANC and other anti-apartheid groups.

References

External links
Rethinking Gender and Agency in the Satyagraha Movementof 1913, by Kalpana Hiralal, University of Kwazulu-Natal, South Africa
The Collected Works of Mahatma Gandhi Volume 10
The Collected Works of Mahatma Gandhi Volume 11
The Collected Works of Mahatma Gandhi Volume 12
The Collected Works of Mahatma Gandhi Volume 14
The Collected Works of Mahatma Gandhi Volume 16
The Collected Works of Mahatma Gandhi Volume 17

1891 births
1909 deaths